Tom Frederick Garnish (3 May 1900 – 1991) was an English professional footballer who played as an outside right in the Football League for Brentford and Fulham.

Club career

Brentford 
After beginning his career in non-League football with hometown club Wandsworth, Garnish signed for Third Division South club Brentford in 1923. He joined at a time when the club was at a low ebb and made 46 appearances, scoring 6 goals, in two seasons at Griffin Park, before departing in September 1925.

Fulham 
Garnish joined Brentford's West London rivals Fulham on trial in September 1925. He made just one Second Division appearance before departing the following year.

Sheppey United 
Garnish dropped back into non-League football to join Kent League First Division club Sheppey United in 1926. He won the league title and promotion to the Southern League with the club in the 1927–28 season.

Honours 
Sheppey United
Kent League First Division: 1927–28

Career statistics

References

1900 births
Footballers from Wandsworth
English footballers
Brentford F.C. players
English Football League players
Fulham F.C. players
Sheppey United F.C. players
1991 deaths
Association football outside forwards
Association football midfielders
Kent Football League (1894–1959) players